Capital punishment is abolished in Bolivarian Republic of Venezuela. 

Venezuela was the first country (still existing) in the world to abolish the death penalty for all crimes, doing so by Constitution in 1864. San Marino had abolished the death penalty for ordinary crimes only in 1848, but abolished it for all crimes in 1865.

Costa Rica followed suit in 1877, making Venezuela one of just three countries to have abolished the death penalty by 1900.

References

Law of Venezuela
Venezuela
Death in Venezuela
Human rights abuses in Venezuela